Osamu "Herb" Wakabayashi (December 23, 1944 – June 2, 2015) was a Canadian-Japanese professional ice hockey player.

Biography and career
He was born in Neys, Ontario, and moved to Chatham, Ontario, where he excelled at both hockey and baseball. In 1964, Wakabayashi entered Boston University where he played freshman hockey.  In his sophomore year, he moved up to varsity where he set a Boston University and ECAC record for assists in a season with 51.  In the same year he was named the most valuable player of The Beanpot. 

The following year his accolades continued when he was named to the All America, All East and All New England first teams, as well as the Most Valuable Player on his team and Athlete of the Year of the University. As a senior, he again received All American and All New England honors. He finished his illustrious career with the most assists in Terrier history with 90 and second all time scorer with 145 points. Also in his senior year he played baseball where he hit .367 leading the Terriers to the regional finals of the ECAC playoffs. 

In 1972, he and his brother Mel moved to Japan where they represented the Japanese national ice hockey team.  He played in three Olympics, including the 1980 games at Lake Placid. He carried the Japanese flag at the opening ceremony of the 1980 Winter Olympics. He died on June 2, 2015, in Sapporo, Japan.

Awards and honors

References

1944 births
2015 deaths
Canadian sportspeople of Japanese descent
Boston University Terriers men's ice hockey players
Naturalized citizens of Japan
Japanese-Canadian internees
Japanese ice hockey players
Olympic ice hockey players of Japan
People from Thunder Bay District
Ice hockey people from Ontario
Ice hockey players at the 1972 Winter Olympics
Ice hockey players at the 1976 Winter Olympics
Ice hockey players at the 1980 Winter Olympics
Canadian expatriates in Japan
AHCA Division I men's ice hockey All-Americans